The Allama Iqbal Express is a passenger train operated daily by Pakistan Railways between Karachi and Sialkot, two important industrial hubs of Pakistan.

History
The Allama Iqbal Express is one of the oldest express trains of Pakistan, beginning in 1940 as the Shaheen Express from Karachi to Sialkot via Faisalabad. In 1985, Shaheen Express was renamed to Allama Iqbal Express, in honor of Pakistan's famous poet Dr. Muhammad Iqbal.

Route
In 1998, the Allama Iqbal Express was redirected via Wazirabad Junction to Sialkot Junction. In 2004, it was again redirected to the current route via Narowal Junction.

 Karachi Cantonment–Shahdara Bagh Junction via Karachi–Peshawar Railway Line
 Shahdara Bagh Junction–Narowal Junction via Shahdara Bagh–Chak Amru Branch Line 
 Narowal Junction–Sialkot Junction via Wazirabad–Narowal Branch Line

Station stops

Equipment
Allama Iqbal Express consists of 16 coaches (all economy class accommodation), one power van and one luggage van.

See also
 Pakistan Railways

References 

Named passenger trains of Pakistan
Passenger trains in Pakistan
Transport in Sialkot